Raymond C. Ortlund Jr. is the former and founding Pastor of Immanuel Church in Nashville, Tennessee. He now serves as President of Renewal Ministries and as Canon Theologian and Deacon in the Diocese of the Western Gulf Coast of the Anglican Church in North America.

Education
Ortlund received a B.A. from Wheaton College in 1971, a Th.M. from Dallas Theological Seminary in 1975, an M.A. from the University of California, Berkeley in 1978, and a Ph.D. from the University of Aberdeen, Scotland in 1985.

Ministry
Ortlund was ordained by Lake Avenue Congregational Church, Pasadena, California in 1975. He served as a pastor in various churches from 1975 to 2019:
1975–1981: Pastoral staff, Peninsula Bible Church, Palo Alto, California. 
1982–1985: Assistant Minister, Banchory Ternan West Parish Church (Church of Scotland).
1985–1989: Pastor, Cascade Presbyterian Church (PCA), Eugene, Oregon. 
1989–1998: Associate Professor of Old Testament and Semitic Languages, Trinity Evangelical Divinity School, Deerfield, Illinois.
1998–2003: Senior Pastor, First Presbyterian Church (PCA), Augusta, Georgia.
2004–2007: Senior Pastor, Christ Presbyterian Church (PCA), Nashville, Tennessee.
2008–2019: Senior Pastor, Immanuel Church (Acts 29), Nashville, Tennessee.

Personal life
Ray and Jani Ortlund have been married for 51 years, with four children and fifteen grandchildren.

References

Living people
Year of birth missing (living people)
People from Nashville, Tennessee
Dallas Theological Seminary alumni
Wheaton College (Illinois) alumni
University of California, Berkeley alumni
Presbyterian Church in America ministers
Alumni of the University of Aberdeen